Transactions of the Royal Society refers to the Philosophical Transactions of the Royal Society.
It may also refer to:
 Transactions of the Royal Society of Edinburgh
 Transactions and Proceedings of the Royal Society of New Zealand
 Transactions of the Royal Society of Tropical Medicine and Hygiene